Cheryl Francis Taylor (born March 1964) is the Controller of CBBC in Salford.

Early life
She was brought up in Liverpool in a family of Quakers. She went to the independent boarding school The Mount School, York, where she became Head Girl. York was known for its Quaker heritage, which largely centred around the famous chocolate factories. She studied Drama at the University of Bristol.

Career

Hat Trick Productions
She was Head of Comedy at Hat Trick Productions. With Carmel Morgan, she co-created Drop Dead Gorgeous for BBC Three.

CBBC
On 29 June 2012 it was announced that she would be the next Controller of CBBC. She began in September 2012. On 21 December 2012, children's teatime programming on BBC One finished.

Personal life
She lives near Hebden Bridge in West Yorkshire.

See also
 Kay Benbow, Controller of CBeebies

References

External links
 
 Prolific North
 BBC biography

1964 births
Alumni of the University of Bristol
BBC executives
British Quakers
Broadcast mass media people from Liverpool
People educated at The Mount School, York
People from Hebden Bridge
Living people